New Augusta Historic District is a national historic district located at Indianapolis, Indiana.  It encompasses 114 contributing buildings, 1 contributing structure, and 1 contributing object in a railroad oriented village in Indianapolis.  The district developed between about 1852 and 1939, and includes representative examples of Italianate and Bungalow / American Craftsman style architecture. Notable contributing buildings include the Odd Fellows Building (c. 1890), Hopewell Evangelical Lutheran Church (c. 1859, c. 1880), Salem Lutheran Church (1880), and New Augusta Depot (c. 1890). It is located west of Augusta.

It was listed on the National Register of Historic Places in 1989.

Painter Florence Smithburn was a native of New Augusta.

References

Historic districts on the National Register of Historic Places in Indiana
Italianate architecture in Indiana
Bungalow architecture in Indiana
Historic districts in Indianapolis
National Register of Historic Places in Indianapolis